Holger Rune won the boys' singles tennis title at the 2019 French Open, defeating Toby Kodat in the final, 6–3, 6–7(5–7), 6–0.

Tseng Chun-hsin was the defending champion, but chose not to participate.

Seeds

Draw

Finals

Top half

Section 1

Section 2

Bottom half

Section 3

Section 4

Qualifying

Seeds

Qualifiers

Draw

First qualifier

Second qualifier

Third qualifier

Fourth qualifier

Fifth qualifier

Sixth qualifier

Seventh qualifier

Eighth qualifier

External links 
Draw
 Qualifying Draw

Boys' Singles
2019